In mathematics, specifically in axiomatic set theory, a Hartogs number is an ordinal number associated with a set. In particular, if X is any set, then the Hartogs number of X is the least ordinal α such that there is no injection from α into X.  If X can be well-ordered then the cardinal number of α is a minimal cardinal greater than that of X.  If X cannot be well-ordered then there cannot be an injection from X to α. However, the cardinal number of α is still a minimal cardinal not less than or equal to the cardinality of X. (If we restrict to cardinal numbers of well-orderable sets then that of α is the smallest that is not not less than or equal to that of X.) The map taking X to α is sometimes called Hartogs's function. This mapping is used to construct the aleph numbers, which are all the cardinal numbers of infinite well-orderable sets.

The existence of the Hartogs number was proved by Friedrich Hartogs in 1915, using Zermelo–Fraenkel set theory alone (that is, without using the axiom of choice).

Hartogs's theorem

Hartogs's theorem states that for any set X, there exists an ordinal α such that ; that is, such that there is no injection from α to X. As ordinals are well-ordered, this immediately implies the existence of a Hartogs number for any set X. Furthermore, the proof is constructive and yields the Hartogs number of X.

Proof
See .

Let  be the class of all ordinal numbers β for which an injective function exists from β  into X.

First, we verify that α is a set.
X × X is a set, as can be seen in Axiom of power set.
 The power set of X × X is a set, by the axiom of power set.
 The class W of all reflexive well-orderings of subsets of X is a definable subclass of the preceding set, so it is a set by the axiom schema of separation.
 The class of all order types of well-orderings in W is a set by the axiom schema of replacement, as
(Domain(w), w)  (β, ≤)
can be described by a simple formula.

But this last set is exactly α. Now, because a transitive set of ordinals is again an ordinal, α is an ordinal.  Furthermore, there is no injection from α into X, because if there were, then we would get the contradiction that α ∈ α.  And finally, α is the least such ordinal with no injection into X.  This is true because, since α is an ordinal,  for any β < α, β ∈ α so there is an injection from β into X.

Historic remark

In 1915, Hartogs could use neither von Neumann-ordinals nor the replacement axiom, and so his result is one of Zermelo set theory and looks rather different from the modern exposition above. Instead, he considered the set of isomorphism classes of well-ordered subsets of X and the relation in which the class of A precedes that of B if A is isomorphic with a proper initial segment of B. Hartogs showed this to be a well-ordering greater than any well-ordered subset of X. (This must have been historically the first genuine construction of an uncountable well-ordering.) However, the main purpose of his contribution was to show that trichotomy for cardinal numbers implies the (then 11 year old) well-ordering theorem (and, hence, the axiom of choice).

See also
Successor cardinal
Aleph number

References

 
 

Set theory
Cardinal numbers